Vicki Lee Taylor (born 10 August 1984) is an English theatre & television actress and television presenter.

Vicki Lee Taylor was born in Grimsby, Lincolnshire, and at the age of twelve appeared in the leading role of Emma in Listen to the Wind (King's Head Theatre, London) and recorded the cast album at the Abbey Road Studios. This secured her a national tour of Enid Blyton’s The Famous Five, playing tomboy George.

Her first notable television appearance was the role of Dino in the series The Queen's Nose. Whilst studying for her GCSE exams she also appeared in the lead role of Little Meg in both popular series of Big Meg, Little Meg and as the guest lead Deborah for several episodes of Heartbeat.

She also appeared as the co-presenter on Sooty (ITV) from 2001–04, recording three series.

In addition to acting, Taylor has won awards for singing and dancing (including a guest appearance on the BBC Series Star for a Night). She has appeared in numerous pantomimes, including Snow White (Cardiff) and Dick Whittington (Leamington Spa) and most recently as Cinderella (High Wycombe). In 2008, she was in The Witches of Eastwick UK Tour with Marti Pellow.
In 2013 she played the role of Maggie Winslow in the West End revival of A Chorus Line at the London Palladium.
She followed this by appearing as Daisy Gamble at the Union Theatre, London, in On a Clear Day You Can See Forever.

References

External links 
 
 

1984 births
English stage actresses
English child actresses
Living people
People from Grimsby
English television actresses